Büren is a municipality in the district of Paderborn, in North Rhine-Westphalia, Germany.

Geography
Büren is situated at the confluence of the rivers Alme and Afte, approx. 20 km south-west of Paderborn and approx. 30 km south-east of Lippstadt.

Neighbouring municipalities
 Brilon
 Geseke
 Rüthen
 Salzkotten
 Bad Wünnenberg

Division of the town
After the local government reforms of 1975 Büren consists of the following districts:

Transportation
Train connections to the outside world are laid off.

Twin towns – sister cities

Büren is twinned with:
 Kortemark, Belgium (1981)
 Charenton-le-Pont, France (1989)
 Mittersill, Austria (1995)
 Ignalina, Lithuania (2003)

Culture and notable places
The village of Wewelsburg is the home of the Wewelsburg Renaissance castle, which was a focus of SS mythology during the Nazism era. The castle now hosts the museum of the district of Paderborn with the permanent exhibition "Wewelsburg 1933–1945. Place of cult and terror of the SS".

Notable people

 Adelaide II of Büren (die 1220), abbess
 Moritz von Büren (1604–1661), founder of the Jesuit college
 Daniel Farke (born 1976), football player and manager
 Michael Henke (born 1957), football player and manager

References

External links
 Official site 

Paderborn (district)